The Okeechobee County Courthouse, built in 1926, is an historic courthouse building located at 304 Northwest Second Street in Okeechobee, Florida. It was designed by architect George Gaynor Hyde of Miami in what has been variously called the Southern Colonial Revival or Mediterranean Revival style of architecture. Due to the collapse of the Florida Land Boom during its construction, its central dome was never built. After the 1928 Okeechobee hurricane, its hallways were used as a temporary morgue. An open breezeway was planned and built through the center front of the first floor but was later enclosed; the winding stairways to the second floor courtroom still remain.

In 1989, the Okeechobee County Courthouse was listed in A Guide to Florida's Historic Architecture, published by the University of Florida Press.

References

Buildings and structures in Okeechobee County, Florida
County courthouses in Florida
Government buildings completed in 1926
1926 establishments in Florida